Jeff Mermelstein (born 1957) is an American photojournalist and street photographer, known for his work in New York City.

Life and work
Mermelstein lives in Greenwood Heights, Brooklyn, New York.

Using the camera on an iPhone, he made a series of photographs of messages on people's phone screens in New York City. He began the series in October 2017 and published it periodically on Instagram, then as the book #nyc in 2020.

Publications

Books by Mermelstein
SideWalk. 
Stockport: Dewi Lewis, 1999. . 
Arles: Actes Sud, 1999. .
Frankfurt: Umschau/Braus, 1999. .
Side Walk: Per le strade di New York. Rome: Peliti, 1999. .
No Title Here. New York: powerHouse, 2003. .
Twirl×Run. New York: powerHouse, 2009. .
Arena. TBW, 2019. . With an afterword by Robert Slifkin.
Hardened. London: Mörel, 2019. . Edited by David Campany.
#nyc. London: Mack, 2020. .

Other books with contributions by Mermelstein
Sophie Howarth and Stephen McLaren, eds. Street Photography Now. London: Thames & Hudson, 2010;  (English, hardback). London: Thames & Hudson, 2010;  (French). London: Thames & Hudson, 2012;  (English, paperback).

Awards
1991: Aaron Siskind Foundation Individual Photographer's Fellowship
1998: European Publishers Award for Photography

Exhibitions

Solo
Color Photographs, Dance Theater Workshop Gallery; New York City, 1987
Recent Color Photographs, The Camera Club of New York, New York City, 1991
SideWalk, Italy, France, Ireland, Canada, 1999–2001
Ground Zero, International Center of Photography, New York, 2002
Jeff Mermelstein, Steven Kasher Gallery, New York City, 2006

References

External links 
Mermelstein's Instagram

1957 births
Living people
American photographers
Street photographers
Artists from New Brunswick